End of You is a Finnish alternative rock/gothic metal band formed in 2003 in Helsinki.

History

End Of You was formed in 2003 by Jami Pietilä.  After their first video and seven-song demo "Walking With No one" they raised significant interest amongst gothic metal listeners and were signed by Spinefarm Records (Universal).

In November 2005 the first single "Walking with no one" reached No. 17 on the charts and got a lot of air time in Finnish radio stations. On January 4, 2006, it was released in Europe and on March 29, 2006, the anticipated debut album, Unreal, were released. After the release End Of You was interviewed in many music magazines, radio/TV -shows and performed in music festivals.

End Of You's 2nd album Mimesis was released in April 2008 and the single "You Deserve more" had a good reception on Finnish rock radio stations. Unreal and Mimesis were produced by Hiili Hiilesmaa (HIM, Apocalyptica).

On 2009 End Of You decided to part ways with Spinefarm Records and released their 3rd album Remains of the Day together with Playground Music. Single "Star Parade" can still be heard in playlists of many Finnish rock bars and nightclubs.

After headlining a show at famous Tavastia rock club in Helsinki March 2011, End of You decided that is time to take a break after touring eight years.

After the decision End Of You's lead singer Jami Pietilä went around the world trip for almost a year. After the trip, End of You wrote enough material for couple albums, but decided not to complete and release those recordings at the time being. For a while band members took some time to concentrate other projects, but on 2017 band got back together and decided that is time to release something new. Single "Stay" were released November 2017 and "Soul Eater" in May 2018. "Bird on the Wire" were released July 2018.

Members
Current members
 Jami Pietilä – vocals (2003–present)
 Jani Karppanen – guitar (2003–present)
 Joni Borodavkin – keyboards (2003–present)

Past members
 Marko Borodavkin – bass (2009–2017)
 Timo Lehtinen – bass (2003–2009)
 Mika Keijonen – drums (2004–2008)
 Rami Kokko – drums (2003–2004)
 Otto Mäkelä – drums (2009–2010)
 Heikki Sjöblom – drums (2010–2011)

Discography

Albums

Singles
 "Walking With No One" (2006)
 "Upside Down" (2006)
 "You Deserve More" (2008)
 "Star Parade" (2010)
 "Just Like You" (2011)
 "Drift Away" (2013)
 "Stay" (2017)
 "Soul Eater" (2018)
 "Bird on the Wire" (2018)
 "Tyhjä Maa" (2019)
 "Ikuisessa meressä" (2020)
 "Aika" (2020)

Demos
 Walking With No One (2004)

Compilations
 Spinefarm Metal DVD Vol. III (2007)
 Orkus Magazine 19 (CD, Smplr, Enh) (2006)
 Metal Hammer: Grilled à la Spinefarm  (2005)

External links

References

Finnish gothic metal musical groups
Musical groups established in 2003
Finnish gothic rock groups
Finnish alternative rock groups